Huda Sajjad Mahmoud Shaker (born 5 November 1978,               العمر : ٤٣ سنة ), عدد الاولاد:٣ is an Iraqi politician from Najaf Governorate. She holds a bachelor's degree in chemistry. She served as a member of the Council of Representatives for the governorate of Qadisiyah in its second session (2010-2014) and the third session (2014-2018) for State of Law Coalition inside Islamic Dawa Party. On 2016 was accused of extorting public officials to obtain money.

References

1978 births
Living people
Members of the Council of Representatives of Iraq
Iraqi chemists
21st-century Iraqi women politicians
21st-century Iraqi politicians
People from Najaf Province
Islamic Dawa Party politicians